Concord's Colonial Inn (also known as Colonial Inn) is a historic inn in Concord, Massachusetts, United States. Its original structure, which is still in use, was built in 1716. It became a hotel in 1889.

The inn is included in the National Register of Historic Places as part of the listed Concord Monument Square–Lexington Road Historic District. The inn overlooks the square on its northern side, and is one of the oldest properties listed on the Register.

The inn, which was given its current name in 1900 after being known as The Colonial House (or The Colonial) for three years, has been a member of Historic Hotels of America since 2005.

The building was formerly three separate constructions, combined into one in 1897. The middle section, today's main inn, was used as an ammunitions store during the Revolutionary War. Specifically, within the building, the Village Forge Tavern room was used as a storeroom for supplies during the war 

The inn has a connection with Henry David Thoreau, whose grandfather built its eastern section. It was inherited by Henry's father in 1801. Thoreau later stayed at the inn for two years while studying at Harvard University.

Original properties
Three of Concord's historic houses, formerly distinct from one another, were joined to form the current structure in 1897.

Thoreau House
The east section was built in 1716 by Colonel James Minot, grandfather of cabinetmaker Ammi White, who lived there. (White was involved in a controversy in 1775, when he attacked a wounded British soldier at the Old North Bridge with an axe, crushing his skull. It was later reported by passing British soldiers that he had been scalped and had his ears cut off.) The Whites sold the house in 1799 to John Thoreau (1754–1801), maternal grandfather of Henry David Thoreau. John Thoreau died in 1801, aged 46 or 47, but the property remained the home of his son, John Thoreau (1787–1859), and his wife, Cynthia Dunbar (1787–1872), Henry's parents. It became known as the Thoreau House in 1889, when this and the middle building were purchased at auction by John Maynard Keyes (born 1862) and used as a boarding house and a small hotel.

Main building
In 1775, during the Revolutionary War, the middle section of the structure stored arms and provisions for the Concord Minutemen.

The White House
The west section was the home of Deacon John White and his wife Esther Kettell. White would detain those people who travelled on the adjacent Lowell Road on the Sabbath.

John Keyes purchased this building in 1897 and combined it with the other two, reopening as The Colonial.

History

Many inhabitants of Concord made the inn their winter home in the first half of the 20th century. Around that time, the proprietor was William R. Rand.

In 1960, the inn underwent a large expansion with the addition of the Prescott Wing (named for Revolutionary figure William Prescott), which doubled the number of rooms to 32. A dining room, Merchants Row, was added in 1970, the name being a reference to John Thoreau, who was a merchant in Boston. The inn has a second restaurant, The Liberty, which also includes Forge Tavern.

In 1966, a visitor staying in room 24, claimed to see an apparition at her bedside.

German hotelier Jurgen Demisch purchased the hotel in 1988. He owned it for 27 years, selling it to Michael and Dorothy Harrington in 2015, a year before the original building's 300th anniversary.

Notable visitors
In 1775, British spy "John Howe" is believed to have stayed at the inn. Under the order of General Thomas Gage, he was tasked with examining the "roads, bridge and fording places" to ascertain the best route for an army to take between Boston and Worcester "to destroy military stores deposited there." He returned via Concord, where he states he was introduced to Major John Buttrick and others and was invited to dine with them at the tavern. He states in his diary, published in Concord, New Hampshire, in 1827:

The authenticity of this source has been questioned.

Henry David Thoreau lived at the inn with his aunts between 1835 and 1837 while he studied at Harvard University.

In 1972, Jacqueline Kennedy, widow of former United States president John F. Kennedy, rented rooms at the inn when she first visited her daughter, Caroline, who was studying at Concord Academy.

Gallery

References

External links

Buildings and structures in Concord, Massachusetts
1716 establishments in Massachusetts
Hotels in Massachusetts
Hotels established in 1889
Reportedly haunted locations in Massachusetts
Historic Hotels of America